Royalston Avenue/Farmers Market (Royalston) and 7th Street & Olson/5th Avenue is a  Metro station in Minneapolis, Minnesota. The light rail (LRT) stop, Royalston, is under construction as part of the Southwest LRT extension of the Green Line, anticipated to open 2027. The bus rapid transit (BRT) stop, 7th Street & Olson/5th Avenue, is served by the C Line and then by the  D Line beginning December 3, 2022.

The station is located in Minneapolis's North Loop neighborhood, and provides access to the Minneapolis Farmers Market and the Metro Transit Campus, the eponymous agency's headquarters. The station is positioned east of I-94 and north of I-394.

History
The C Line station, with platforms located farside on 7th Street (southbound) and Olson Memorial Highway (northbound), opened late 2016 as part of the 7th Street Pilot Station Project. The shelters use the unified "kit-of-parts" design found across the A Line, also opened that same year, unlike the unique BRT shelters further south on 7th Street at Hennepin and Nicollet completed a year prior. The only modification needed before the launch of C Line service was the installation of ticket vending machines and Go-To card validators.

The placement of the northbound C Line platform at the existing stop was to accommodate buses turning left from 7th Street onto Olson Highway, as a platform sited on 7th Street could not facilitate safe bus movements through the intersection. An alignment of the D Line that used this northbound platform was studied, but ultimately not pursued after field tests. In testing, additional movements resulted in delays averaging two minutes with a high variability, and could exceed four minutes. Instead, a platform farside of 5th Avenue was chosen. Design and construction of the 5th Avenue platform was coordinated and funded as part of the Southwest LRT project rather than the D Line project. Work began on the 5th Avenue platform the week of July 18, 2022. Southbound the D Line shares the existing C Line platform.

The station opened as Olson & 7th Street and will be renamed when the additional platform is complete.

Southwest LRT station
The station had the lowest predicted 2030 ridership from projections in 2014. Cutting the station was considered to save costs in 2015. The area was considered for a new Minnesota United FC stadium but Allianz Field was ultimately built in the Midway neighborhood of Saint Paul. The Metropolitan Council sought archaeological services for sites nearby the station in 2017. The station was renamed from Royalston Station to "Royalston Ave./Farmers Market" in 2016.

References

Gallery

External links
Royalston Avenue/Farmers Market Station Engineering Design

Metro Green Line (Minnesota) stations
Railway stations scheduled to open in 2027
Transportation buildings and structures in Hennepin County, Minnesota
Railway stations under construction in the United States